A slugger most often means a baseball or softball player with a high slugging percentage.

Slugger or Sluggers may also refer to:

 Silver Slugger Award, an annual baseball award presented to the best offensive player at each position in both the American League and the National League
 Louisville Slugger, a brand of baseball bat
 Louisville Slugger Field, a baseball stadium in Louisville, Kentucky
 Berlin Sluggers, a German baseball team founded in 1985
 Abbeville Sluggers, an American minor league baseball team in 1920
 Slugger Labbe (born 1968), American NASCAR crew chief
 Slugger, a boxing style
 The Louisville Sluggers, also known as The Sluggers, a former Australian Swing Revival band formed in the late 1990s

See also
 Louieville Sluggah (born 1976), stage name of rapper Barret Powell
 Slug (disambiguation)